Tiger  is a 2017 Indian Kannada-language action film directed by Nanda Kishore, produced by Smt. Chikkaboramma under the banner Inchara Film Factory. The film stars Pradeep, Nyra Banerjee, Om Puri, K. Shivram, P. Ravishankar, Chikkanna and Sadhu Kokila in prominent roles.

Music was composed by Arjun Janya, art direction by Mohan B Kere for the film. Stunt sequence choreographed by Thriller Manju, Different Danny, Vijay, Ganesh, and Ravi Varma. It was dubbed in Hindi as Policewale ki Jung.

Plot
The movie Tiger is a Kannada action packed thriller film led by the young star Pradeep (protagonist) who dreams to become a police officer which is against the wish of his father played by the well known actor and also a very famous Ex IAS officer K Shivram. Why is the father against the wish and the dream of his son is the crux of the story.

Cast
Pradeep as Ashok Nayak														
Nyra as Gowri														
K. Shivram as Shivram Nayak	
Om Puri as Oriya												
P. Ravi Shankar as Shankar Narayan														
Chikkanna as Bahubali												
Sadhu Kokila as Kharjura														
Rangayana Raghu as Lion Linga														
Sonia Agarwal as Lakshmi
Raj Deepak Shetty as MLA

Production
In August 2014 Pradeep, Tharun Kishore Sudhir and Nanda Kishore Decided to a project together. Tharun kishore Sudhir wrote the script just for Pradeep and his elder brother Nanda Kishora decided to Direct. The film was started under the banner of Inchara Film Factory which produced its first film under the producer Smt. Chikkaboramma. This is Pradeep's come back movie and is expected to do very well at the box office as it has the best technicians of the Kannada film industry and is made with a rich production value. This is the last appearance of the Indian actor Om Puri on a Kannada film before his death.

Soundtrack
Arjun Janya also known as the magical composer of sandalwood has composed the soundtrack and background music for the film. The soundtrack album consists of six songs. Lyrics for the tracks were written by V. Nagendra Prasad, Yogaraj Bhat, Yoganand Muddan and Lokesh Krishna. Track released on the internet prior to the film release went viral which was sung by the Kannada super star Sudeepa and still remains a chart topper. Beladingla ratrili a romantic song sung by Sonu Nigam is still a favorite amongst the younger crowd. Deciding to tie up with a music label the producers released the album  in November 2016  under Lahari Music company. The audio was released by the Ex chief minister of Karnataka Shri B. S. Yeddyurappa.

References

External links 
 

2017 films
2010s Kannada-language films
Indian action films
Indian coming-of-age films
Films scored by Arjun Janya
Films directed by Nanda Kishore
2017 action films
2010s coming-of-age films